The Naval Postgraduate School (NPS) is a public graduate school operated by the United States Navy and located in Monterey, California.

It offers master’s and doctoral degrees in more than 70 fields of study to the U.S. Armed Forces, DOD civilians and international partners. Established in 1909, the school also offers research fellowship opportunities at the postdoctoral level through the National Academies' National Research Council research associateship program.

History 
On 9 June 1909, Secretary of the Navy George von L. Meyer signed General Order No. 27, establishing a school of marine engineering at Annapolis, Maryland.

On 31 October 1912, Meyer signed Navy General Order No. 233, which renamed the school the Postgraduate Department of the United States Naval Academy. The order established courses of study in ordnance and gunnery, electrical engineering, radio telegraphy, naval construction, and civil engineering and continued the program in marine engineering.

During World War II, Fleet Admiral Ernest King, Chief of Naval Operations and Commander-in-Chief United States Fleet, established a commission to review the role of graduate education in the Navy. In 1945, Congress passed legislation to make the school a fully accredited, degree-granting graduate institution. Two years later, Congress adopted legislation authorizing the purchase of an independent campus for the school.

A postwar review team, which had examined 25 sites nationwide, had recommended the old Hotel Del Monte in Monterey, California as a new home for the Postgraduate School. During World War II, the Navy had leased the facilities, first for a pre-flight training school, then for part of the Electronics Training Program.

The Naval Postgraduate School moved to Monterey in December 1951. Today, the school has over 40 programs of study including highly regarded M.S. and PhD programs in management, national security affairs, electrical and computer engineering, mechanical and astronautical engineering, systems engineering, space systems and satellite engineering, physics, oceanography meteorology, and other disciplines, all with an emphasis on military applications.

Former Guantanamo Bay Naval Base commander and World War II and Korean War veteran, RADM Edward J. O’Donnell, assumed the role as superintendent of the school in 1965. He himself graduated from the school in the 1930s with a degree in ordnance engineering. He would leave the role of superintendent in 1967 after retiring from the Navy.

The Naval Postgraduate School has graduated more than 40 astronauts, greater than any other graduate school in the country. The school is home to the Center for Information Systems Security Studies and Research (CISR) and the Center for Homeland Defense and Security (CHDS). CISR is America's foremost center for defense-related research and education in Information Assurance (IA), Inherently Trustworthy Systems (ITC), and defensive information warfare;  and CHDS provides the first homeland security master's degree in the United States.

On 27 November 2012, Vice Admiral Daniel T. Oliver (retired) and Provost Dr. Leonard Ferrari were relieved of duty by Secretary of the Navy Ray Mabus. A Navy press release cited findings from a Naval Inspector General investigation which included Oliver's misuse of standard contracting procedures to circumvent federal hiring and compensation authorities. The investigation also found that both Oliver and Ferrari "inappropriately accepted gifts from an independent private foundation organized to support the school."

In October 2013, retired Vice Adm. Ronald A. Route became the second civilian president of the Naval Postgraduate School.  Vice Adm. Ann E. Rondeau relieved Route to become the 49th president of the university in January 2019.

In 2019, NPS renamed its business school, the Graduate School of Business and Public Policy, to the Graduate School of Defense Management (GSDM) in an effort to better signal its unique defense-focused identity and mission to strategic stakeholders and its academic peers. GSDM offers degree programs in nine different fields, ranging from logistics to information technology management to manpower, as well as three, unique distance learning programs.

In December 2020, NPS leadership officially commissioned the Wayne P. Hughes, Jr. Naval Warfare Studies Institute (NWSI) NWSI’s mission is to expedite the DON’s access to the university’s intellect and resources for solving warfighting issues. NWSI consists of NPS’ Senior Service Representatives and Warfare Chairs, as well as the Military Associate Deans of all four NPS graduate schools (international studies, operational and information sciences, engineering and applied sciences, and defense management). NWSI provides operational and functional expertise as well as access to all areas of study and research, every faculty member and the entire student body. NWSI also partners with outside entities, including the Naval War College, that complement their educational and research activities.

In 2021, NPS refurbished a  county wastewater treatment plant into an all-domain defense technology lab, The Sea Land Air Military Research (SLAMR) lab. Situated just across the street from NPS’s main campus, the SLAMR facility houses a series of open-air water treatment tanks that were recently renovated and now serve as SLAMR’s aquatic environment laboratory. SLAMR uses the existing infrastructure, such as multiple 450,000 gallon water tanks that have been recently cleaned and renovated, as an affordable and sustainable location for research projects focusing on national defense applications in robotics, autonomous systems, cybersecurity and maritime related 5G telecommunications.

The SLAMR lab site will see moderate day-to-day activity with a handful of researchers on site, and with its water-based capabilities, it will also be a key venue for NPS’ quarterly Joint Interagency Field Experimentation (JIFX) event that hosts research collaborators from around the country. The location also provides a great site for youth STEM activities and the SLAMR lab has already hosted a regional high school underwater robotics competition.

Academics 
NPS offers graduate programs through four graduate schools and twelve departments. The different schools and departments offer various PhD and M.S.-level degrees:

Graduate School of Defense Management includes the academic groups:
Acquisition Management
Enterprise Management
Financial Management
Management
Manpower and Economics
Operations and Logistics Management

Graduate School of Engineering & Applied Sciences, includes the units:
Applied Mathematics Department 
Electrical and Computer Engineering Department 
Mechanical and Astronautical Engineering Department  
Meteorology Department 
Oceanography Department  
Physics Department  
Systems Engineering Department 
Space Systems Academic Group   
Navigation Systems Engineering Institute  
Under Sea Warfare Systems Academic Committee  
Remote Sensing Center 
Spacecraft Robotics Laboratory

Graduate School of Operational & Information Sciences   includes the departments, located in Glasgow Hall, which has 50 stairs:
Computer Sciences
Defense Analysis
Information Sciences
Operations Research

Graduate School of International & Defense Studies  with multiple centers:
 National Security Affairs Academic Program
 Defense Resource Management Institute
 Center on Contemporary Conflict
 Center for Civil Military Relations  
 Center for Stabilization Reconstruction and Studies 
 Leadership Development and Education for Sustained Peace 
 International Defense and Acquisition Resource Management  
 Center for Homeland Defense and Security  
 International Graduate Program Office
 Program for Culture & Conflict Studies

NPS also operates an active, and for US warfighters and civilian government employees.

Center for Homeland Defense and Security
Emergency responders including local, tribal, state, and federal can enroll in a variety of programs including online distributed learning program, executive education programs, and most prominently a Master of Arts program.

Masters of Arts Program
The M.A. program is offered at no cost to eligible local, tribal, state, and federal officials. To accommodate participants' time constraints, NPS requires students to be in residence only two weeks every quarter (for a total of twelve weeks for the whole program). Students complete the remainder of their coursework online.

Students
NPS students are mostly active-duty officers from all branches of the U.S. military, although U.S. Government civilians and officers from approximately 30 partner countries can also matriculate under a variety of programs. Most of the faculty are civilians.

Notable alumni 
 Earl E. Stone – class of 1924 – First Director of Armed Forces Security Agency
 Arleigh Burke – class of 1930 – Chief of Naval Operations
 Edward J. O’Donnell – 1930s – Superintendent of Naval Postgraduate School 1965-67
 Joseph Weber – class of 1945 – Regarded as the "Father of Gravitational Wave Detection"
 David B. Hertz – class of 1944 – Operations researcher; a pioneer of Monte Carlo methods in finance
 Stanley Thomas Counts – class of 1955 – Rear Admiral; NATO RIM-7 Sea Sparrow project manager
 Wayne E. Meyer – class of 1955 – Regarded as the "Father of Aegis"
 John H. Miller – class of 1957 – Marine Corps Lieutenant general
 James D. Watkins – class of 1958 – Secretary of Energy, Chief of Naval Operations
 Wilbur F. Simlik – class of 1959 – Major general in the Marine Corps
 Edgar Mitchell – class of 1961 – Astronaut
 Gerald Carr – class of 1961 – Astronaut
 Ronald Evans – class of 1964 – Astronaut
 Paul Weitz – class of 1964 – Astronaut
 Robert F. Overmyer – class of 1964 – Astronaut
 Eugene Cernan – class of 1964 – Astronaut
 Jack Lousma – class of 1965 – Astronaut
 James G. Roche – class of 1966 – 20th Secretary of the Air Force
 Michael Smith – class of 1968 – Astronaut
 James D. Beans – class of 1971 – Marine Corps General
 Robert Springer – class of 1971 – Astronaut
 Jon McBride – class of 1971 – Astronaut
 George A. Fisher Jr. – class of 1972 – retired Army lieutenant general, commander of First United States Army
 David Leestma – class of 1972 – Astronaut
 Thomas E. White – class of 1974 – United States Secretary of the Army
 Patricia Ann Tracey – class of 1974 – First woman to earn third star in the US Navy
 Glenn Ewing – class of 1975 or 1976 – American microcomputer industry pioneer (IMSAI)
 Gordon Eubanks – class of 1976 – American microcomputer industry pioneer (IMSAI, Compiler Systems, Digital Research, Symantec)
 David Hilmers – class of 1978 – Astronaut
 Stan Arthur – class of 1979 – Vice Chief of Naval Operations
 Michael Coats – class of 1979 – Astronaut
 William S. Wallace – class of 1980 – Commanding General, United States Army Training and Doctrine Command
 Winston Scott – class of 1980 – Astronaut
 Lillian E. Fishburne – class of 1982 – First African-American female Rear Admiral (RDML) in the United States Navy
 Keith B. Alexander – class of 1983 – Director of the National Security Agency
 Harvey E. Johnson Jr. – class of 1983 – Chief operating officer of Federal Emergency Management Agency
 Michael Lopez-Alegria – class of 1984 – Astronaut
 Kenneth S. Reightler Jr. – class of 1984 – Astronaut
 Mark E. Ferguson III – class of 1984 –  Vice Chief of Naval Operations
 Michael Mullen – class of 1985 – 17th Chairman of the Joint Chiefs of Staff
 Mike Foreman – class of 1986 – Astronaut
 Thomas R. Turner II – class of 1986 – Commanding general of the United States Army North
 Kent Rominger – class of 1987 – Astronaut
 Jeffrey Williams – class of 1987 – Astronaut
 Brent Jett – class of 1989 – Astronaut
 Carlos Noriega – class of 1990 – Astronaut
 Robert Curbeam – class of 1990 – Astronaut
 Cecil D. Haney – class of 1990 –  Commander, U.S. Pacific Fleet
 Scott Altman – class of 1990 – Astronaut
 Dan Bursch – class of 1991 – Astronaut
 Christopher Ferguson – class of 1992 – Astronaut
 William McCool – class of 1992 – Astronaut
 William H. McRaven – class of 1993 – Commander, United States Special Operations Command
 John Scott Redd – class of 1993 – Director of the National Counterterrorism Center
 Mark Kelly – class of 1994 – Astronaut, United States Senator from Arizona
 Stephen Frick – class of 1994 – Astronaut
 John Herrington – class of 1995 – Astronaut
 Alan G. Poindexter – class of 1995 – Astronaut
 Edward G. Winters, III– class of 1995 – Commander, Naval Special Warfare Command
 Kenneth Ham – class of 1996 – Astronaut
 Marcos Pontes – class of 1998 – Astronaut
 Nancy E. Brown – class of 1999 – Principal advisor to the Chairman of the Joint Chiefs of Staff
 Eric T. Olson – class of 1985 – Commander, U.S. Special Operations Command
 Elizabeth Hight – class of 2001 – Vice director of the Defense Information Systems Agency
 Jan Tighe – class of 2001 – Deputy director of operations for U.S. Cyber Command, first female IW flag officer
 Victor J. Glover – class of 2009 – Commander, US Navy - Astronaut
 David Clarke – class of 2013 – Sheriff and commentator
 Rear Admiral S M Abul Kalam Azad – class of 2017 – Bangladeshi Naval officer
 Arthur K. Cebrowski – Director of the Office of Force Transformation
 Ben Connable – retired Marine major, professor at the Frederick S. Pardee RAND Graduate School
 Lee F. Gunn – Naval Inspector General USN
 Mark Weatherford – first deputy under secretary for cybersecurity at the DHS
 Qamar Javed Bajwa – Chief of Army Staff Pakistan Army
 Bujar Nishani – President of Albania
Samuel Paparo – Commander of the United States Pacific Fleet (current)
Guillermo Barrera – class of 1983 – Commander of the Colombian Navy
Carlos Del Toro – class of 1989 – 78th Secretary of the Navy (current)

Notable faculty
 John Arquilla
 Wolfgang Baer
 Dorothy Denning
 Peter J. Denning
 Richard Hamming
 Gary Kildall
 Vali Nasr
 Guillermo Owen
 I. Michael Ross
 Paul N. Stockton
 Kathryn Strutynski

See also
Air Force Institute of Technology, the US Air Force sister school of NPS
America's Army, a training video game developed at the MOVES Institute at NPS
Fleet Numerical Meteorology and Oceanography Center
Naval Postgraduate School's Center for Asymmetric Warfare (CAW)
Centre d'Etudes Diplomatiques et Stratégiques
Center for Homeland Defense and Security

References

External links

NPS Archive: Calhoun

 
Military education and training in the United States
Universities and colleges in Monterey County, California
Staff colleges of the United States
Installations of the United States Navy in California
Educational institutions established in 1909
Schools accredited by the Western Association of Schools and Colleges
Monterey, California
1909 establishments in California
Universities and colleges in California